was a Japanese actor from Kishiwada, Osaka Prefecture. Takahashi often worked with Kihachi Okamoto and Satsuo Yamamoto. 

After graduating Rikkyo University, Takahashi joined NHK acting school. In 1964, he joined Bungakuza Theatre Company's acting school and became an official member in 1967. In the same year, he gave his film debut with Watashi Machigatterukashira?. He received the Elan d'or Award for Newcomer of the Year in 1968.

He appeared in Onihei's Detective Records although he was fighting against cancer and the film became his final film appearance.

Selected filmography

 Watashi Machigatterukashira? (1966) as Koike
 Japan's Longest Day (1967) as Masataka Ida
 The Human Bullet (1967)
 The Affair (1967) 
 Kill! (1968) as Hanji
 One Day at Summer's End (1968) as tetsuya
 Red Lion (1969) as Ichinose
 Eros + Massacre (1970) as Jun Tsuji
 Men and War (1979) as Godai
 Battle of Okinawa (1971) as Yokichi Kaya
 Zatoichi at Large (1972) as Denjuro Sagara
 Tabi no Omosa (1972) as Daizo Kimura
 Hanzo the Razor: Who's Got the Gold? (1974)
 Kinkanshoku (1975) as Jotaro Furugaki
 Fumō Chitai (1976)
 Shogun's Samurai (1978) as Izu-no-kami Matsudaira Nobutsuna
 DER KAISER IST NICHT AM AUGUST (1978)
 Blue Christmas (1979) as Sawaki
 Nihon no Fixer (1979) as Masaki Kaga
 Return from the River Kwai (1989) as Ozawa
 The River with No Bridge (1992) as Iseda
 East Meets West (1995) as Kimura Settsu no Kami
 Onihei's Detective Records (1995) as Sashima Tadasuke

Television dramas
 Ten to Chi to (1969) as Usami Sadakatsu
 Haru no Sakamichi (TV series) (1971) as Kuroda Nagamasa
 Key Hunter (1972) (ep.221) as Himuro
 Shinsho Taikōki (1973) as Oda Nobunaga
 G-Men '75 (1975, ep.15), (1976 ep.44) (1977, ep,115)
 Daitokai Tatakai no Hibi (1976) (ep.17) as Maejima
 The Yagyu Conspiracy (1978) as Izu-no-kami Matsudaira Nobutsuna
 Hissatsu Shimainin (1981) as Shinmatsu
 The Unfettered Shogun (1981) (ep.144) as Saigu Keisai
 Oshin (1983) as Takura Shin
 Taiyō ni Hoero! (1984) (ep.610)
 Hissatsu Shikirinin (1984) as Toranosuke
 Sanbiki ga Kiru! (1987) (ep.3) as Hirata Kanbei
 Asami Mitsuhiko Series (1987-90)
 Onihei Hankachō (1989-95) as Sashima Tadasuke
 Kasaga no Tsubone (1989) as Sanada Yukimura
 Taiheiki'' (1991) as Momonoi Tadatsune

References

External links
 

Japanese male film actors
20th-century Japanese male actors
1935 births
1996 deaths